Cerithidea quoyii is a species of brackish water snail, a gastropod mollusk in the family Potamididae.

Distribution
This marine species occurs off Vietnam and the Philippines.

Description

Ecology
Cerithidea quoyii is a predominantly mangrove-associated species.

References

External links

Potamididae
Gastropods described in 1848
Taxa named by Jacques Bernard Hombron
Taxa named by Honoré Jacquinot